The 2011 UK Kids Choice Awards took place on 3 April 2011 at 4:30pm. This year it followed a similar format as the one in the United States. There were two Nick UK categories. Voting started on March 1, 2011.

The awards broadcast on Nick UK was the same programme as the original US broadcast, but with special inserts featuring Nick UK presenters announcing the winners of two UK-specific categories.

Nickelodeon UK award categories

Nick UK's Favourite Show
 Big Time Rush
 Victorious
 iCarly
 House of Anubis (Winner)

Nick UK's Funniest Person
Jerry Trainor as Spencer Shay for (iCarly) (Winner)
Matt Bennett as Robbie Shapiro for (Victorious)
Jamie Rickers for (Nick UK)
Matt Shively as Ryan Laserbeam for (True Jackson)

References

External links
Nickelodeon UK's Kids' Choice Awards 2011 Site

Kids' Choice Awards
Nickelodeon Kids' Choice Awards
2011 awards in the United Kingdom